Haedropleura continua is a species of sea snail, a marine gastropod mollusk in the family Horaiclavidae.

Description
The length of the fusiform shell attains 10 mm, its diameter 3.75 mm. It contains 10½ whorls, of which 1½ in the protoconch.

This species is conspicuous for its exactly continuous longitudinal ribs, those of whorl succeeding whorl descending in a perfectly straight line to the base. These whorls are slightly once-angled beyond the centre. The whole surface is white, with a slight ochreous tinge, and smooth

Distribution
This species occurs in the Persian Gulf.

References

External links
  Tucker, J.K. 2004 Catalog of recent and fossil turrids (Mollusca: Gastropoda). Zootaxa 682:1–1295.

continua
Gastropods described in 1903